General Lyttelton may refer to:

Sir Charles Lyttelton, 3rd Baronet (1628–1716), British Army brigadier general
Neville Lyttelton (1845–1931), British Army general
Richard Lyttelton (1718–1770), British Army lieutenant general

See also
Arthur Lyttelton-Annesley (1837–1926), British Army lieutenant general